Ayub Bey (August 23, 1968 – December 13, 2022), known as Grand Daddy I.U., was an American rapper who was a member of the hip-hop group Juice Crew in the 1980s.

Career
Grand Daddy I.U., born in Queens, New York, was raised in Hempstead, Long Island, and encouraged to begin performing by his brother, also known as Kay Cee. He recorded a demo tape and gave it to Biz Markie, who signed him to the label Cold Chillin' Records in 1989. In 1990 he released his debut, Smooth Assassin, which spawned two Rap Chart hits: "Something New" (#11) which sampled James & Bobby Purify's "I'm Your Puppet", and "Sugar Free" (#9). He became noted for his high-end tailored attire, always appearing in public wearing a suit and tie.

Grand Daddy I.U. appeared as a guest on several hip hop albums in the 1990s, including Big L's Lifestylez ov da Poor & Dangerous and Positive K's The Skills Dat Pay da Bills.

Grand Daddy I.U. did ghostwriting and production work for Markie and Roxanne Shanté but became disenchanted with Markie over a dispute involving publishing credits for the tracks on his debut. He released a sophomore effort, Lead Pipe, in 1994. Its lead single "Represent" charted modestly on the US Dance Singles Chart. The album received little promotion, so after the standalone single "All About Money" in 1996, Grand Daddy I.U. quit rapping for nearly a decade.

Grand Daddy I.U. continued to do production work in hip-hop for Das EFX, Heltah Skeltah, KRS-One, and Ice-T among others. He issued a third album, Stick to the Script, in 2007, featuring production from Large Professor and Marco Polo and appearances from 2Pac, DV Alias Khryst, and Pudgee Tha Phat Bastard. In 2017 he reunited with long-time collaborator Pudgee Tha Phat Bastard on the album Still Hear by Long Island emcee Lantz. The pair featured together on two songs, "Til The Casket" and "Yesterday".

In 2020 I.U. released an album The Essence, which featured artists Method Man, Lil Fame, Sadat X, Craig G, Large Professor, and a host of other artists. The album was composed of songs all produced by I.U. and showcased his beat making talents.

After a short break from releasing music, Grand Daddy I.U released a new single "Stay Fly" under Get@Em Recordz on July 2, 2021.

Bey died at age 54 on December 13, 2022.

Personal life
I.U.'s daughter is the indie soul singer Yaya Bey.

Discography

Albums

Singles
 1990 "Something New" (US Rap #11)
 1990 "Sugar Free" (US Rap #9)
 1990 "This Is A Recording"
 1990 "Pick Up The Pace"
 1994 "Represent" (US Dance #54)
 1994 "Don't Stress Me"
 1996 "All About Money"
 2005 "I Be Thuggin'"
 2021 "Stay Fly" (with Shawn Haynes & Monsta Mook)
 2022 "Trust Me" (with Paula Perry & Da Inphamus Amadeuz)

References

1968 births
2022 deaths
People from Hempstead (town), New York
People from Queens, New York
Rappers from New York City
21st-century American rappers
Juice Crew members